The Helena micropolitan area may refer to:

The Helena, Arkansas micropolitan area, United States
The Helena, Montana micropolitan area, United States

See also
Helena (disambiguation)